Anisul Islam can refer to:

 Anisul Islam Mahmud
 Anisul Islam Mondal
 Anisul Islam Emon